Massachusetts House of Representatives' 6th Bristol district in the United States is one of 160 legislative districts included in the lower house of the Massachusetts General Court. It covers part of Bristol County. Democrat Carole Fiola of Fall River has represented the district since 2013.

Locales represented
The district includes the following localities:
 part of Fall River
 part of Freetown

The current district geographic boundary overlaps with that of the Massachusetts Senate's 1st Bristol and Plymouth district.

Former locales
The district previously covered:
 Acushnet, circa 1927 
 part of New Bedford, circa 1927 
 Somerset, circa 1872 
 Swansea, circa 1872

Representatives
 Jervis Shove, circa 1858 
 William Lawton Slade, circa 1859 
 William Gordon Jr., circa 1888 
 Charles P. Rugg, circa 1888 
 Herbert Wing, circa 1920 
 G. Leo Bessette, circa 1951 
 Theophile Jean Desroches, circa 1951 
 William Q. Maclean, Jr., circa 1975 
 Thomas C. Norton
 Albert Herren
 David B. Sullivan
 Carole A. Fiola, 2013-current

See also
 List of Massachusetts House of Representatives elections
 Other Bristol County districts of the Massachusetts House of Representatives: 1st, 2nd, 3rd, 4th, 5th, 7th, 8th, 9th, 10th, 11th, 12th, 13th, 14th
 List of Massachusetts General Courts
 List of former districts of the Massachusetts House of Representatives

Images

References

External links
 Ballotpedia
  (State House district information based on U.S. Census Bureau's American Community Survey).

House
Government of Bristol County, Massachusetts